Sunday Stew was a block of programming aired on Sunday nights between 9-11 p.m. where MTV showed new episodes of their comedic programs targeted towards younger college-aged men.  Like MTV2, the Stew showed short films before and after a show. The branding was discontinued on television in December 2005.

Sunday Stew line-ups 

The following are the shows aired during the Sunday Stew for the time periods listed. Each lineup was referred to as a "season" by MTV; thus, the Sunday Stew aired six "seasons" between 2003 and 2005.

Ten-minute sneak peeks

Occasionally, MTV would air the first 10 minutes of a new movie at the conclusion of the programming block.  Movies previewed included Dodgeball: A True Underdog Story and The Chronicles of Riddick.

References

MTV original programming